A window deflector is mounted above the doors of some automobiles, to protect the inside of the car from rain or other precipitation in case of slightly opened windows.  Deflectors may also be fitted to sunroofs to change the flow of air.

Types 
Based on the way wind deflectors are installed, they may be classified as follows:

In-Channel This type of deflectors is installed into the upper window channel, and is kept in place due to tension. In some applications, this type of deflector also employs a thin stripe of automotive-grade 3M tape to keep the deflector in place.

Stick-on This installation type requires an adhesive tape (i.e. 3M) at the back of the deflectors to mount them securely. This adhesive film allows mounting a deflector above the window (either to the window frames, or to the roof if the windows are frameless).

Similar equipment

Hood protector 
A hood protector or bug guard is a similar look product which is supposed to protect the car paint against insects.

Rear window louvers 

Rear window louvers or rear window blinds (German Heckjalousie or Heckscheibenjalousie) is a type of window blind which can be mounted to the rear window of a car. It is supposed to make the window get less dirty as well as hinder bothersome sunlight from entering through the rear window, but has been criticized by at least one car expert as a fashion phenomena with little practical use. In 1966, Lamborghini Miura became one of the first production cars that came with rear window louvers.

See also 
 Recreational vehicle

References

Automotive body parts
Automotive technologies
Car windows